Para Para is an album by Taiwanese pop singer Ruby Lin. It marks the release of the second album by Bertelsmann Music Group(BMG). A few days after released Double Faced Ruby Lin album, BMG features new AVCD format special edition containing one cantonese song 'Para Para' and bonus VCD.

Track listing
叭啦叭拿 Para Para PaLaPaNa
投懷送抱 Falling Into Your Arms
云深深雨蒙蒙 Dense Cloud Misty Rain
夜宿蘭桂坊 Overnight in Lan Kuai Fong
誰都不愛 To Love Nobody
不設防 Can't Let Go
冬眠地圖 Hibernating Map
新浪漫 New Romance
愛情小說 Novel of Love
每一種男生 Every Type of Guy
你這樣愛我 The Way You Love Me

Bonus VCD
電腦檔案 Format Data (Not Playable)
投懷送抱 ( Music Video ) 
叭啦叭拿 (Music Video ) 
Making of 叭啦叭拿 ( Music Video )

Awards and nominations
Hong Kong MTV Music Award
 Won: Best music video of the year

Hong Kong Metro Radio Awards
 Won: Favorite new singer
 Nom : Golden song of the year

External links
Sina.com Music Page
Baidu Page
Music page

References

2001 albums
Ruby Lin albums